Skąpe  is a settlement in the administrative district of Gmina Złocieniec, within Drawsko County, West Pomeranian Voivodeship, in north-western Poland.

Before 1945 the settlement was part of Germany and known as Beatenhof.

The settlement has a population of 2,007.

See also
History of Pomerania

References

Villages in Drawsko County